Margret Antonie Boveri (14 August 1900 – 6 July 1975) was one of the best-known German journalists and writers of the post-World War II period. She was a recipient of the German Critics' Prize and the Bundesverdienstkreuz.

Life
Margret Boveri was born in Würzburg, Germany, the daughter of German biologist Theodor Boveri and American biologist Marcella O'Grady Boveri. Her father died in 1915 and her mother returned to the USA in 1925. She studied history and political science in Munich and Berlin. From 1934 she worked in the Foreign Affairs section of the Berliner Tageblatt newspaper, where she was promoted by the editor, Paul Scheffer.

From 1939 until 1943 (when the newspaper was banned) she worked as foreign correspondent for the Frankfurter Zeitung newspaper in Stockholm and New York City. She was awarded the War Merit Medal by the Nazi Government in 1941; she herself was never a member of the Nationalist Socialist Party. After the USA entered the war she was interned for a time in New York, before being returned, at her own request, to Europe. In May 1942 she arrived in Lisbon, where she continued her work as correspondent for the Frankfurter Zeitung. While in Lisbon she became acquainted with the Swiss journalist Annemarie Schwarzenbach, who was to die shortly afterwards in an accident in Switzerland.

After the Frankfurter Zeitung was banned by the German government in 1943, Boveri returned to Berlin, where her apartment was destroyed in an air strike. She then took up work as a report writer in the German embassy in Madrid before returning to Berlin in 1944 to work as a freelance writer with the National Socialist weekly Das Reich. 

After the war Boveri disapproved of the division of Germany by the Allies into separate political zones, in which she was supported by Konrad Adenauer, and she maintained her opposition to the division of Germany until the 1960s. In 1968 she was awarded the German Critics' Prize and in 1970 the Bundesverdienstkreuz, the highest civilian honour in West Germany, for promoting understanding between East and West Germany. Among her friends and acquaintances were Wilhelm Conrad Röntgen, Theodor Heuss, Ernst von Weizsäcker, Freya von Moltke, Ernst Jünger, Carl Schmitt, Armin Mohler, Gottfried Benn und Uwe Johnson.

She died in Berlin in 1975.

Works
 Das Weltgeschehen am Mittelmeer, Zurich 1936
 Vom Minarett zum Bohrturm. Eine politische Biographie Vorderasiens, Zurich and Leipzig 1939
 Ein Auto, Wüsten, blaue Perlen. Bericht über eine Reise durch Vorderasien, Leipzig 1939
 modern edition: Wüsten, Minarette und Moscheen. Im Auto durch den alten Orient. Berlin, wjs 2005, 
 Amerika-Fibel für erwachsene Deutsche, Berlin 1946 (modern edition: Berlin (Landt) 2006, 
 16 Fenster und 8 Türen, Berlin 1953
 Der Verrat im XX. Jahrhundert, 4 Volumes, Hamburg 1956–1960
 Wir lügen alle. Eine Hauptstadtzeitung unter Hitler, Olten and Freiburg im Breisgau 1965
 Tage des Überlebens. Berlin 1945, Munich 1968. Modern edition: Berlin, wjs 2004, 
 Erinnerte Mutmaßungen, in: Neue Deutsche Hefte 16, 205–208, 1969
 Die Deutschen und der Status Quo, Munich 1974
 Verzweigungen. Eine Autobiographie, published by Uwe Johnson, Munich 1977modern edition: Frankfurt am Main, Suhrkamp 1996,

References

Sources
 . Extract published in 
 Belke, Ingrid: Auswandern oder bleiben? Die Publizistin Margret Boveri (1900–1975) im Dritten Reich. In: Zeitschrift für Geschichtswissenschaft 53 (2005), S. 118–137.
 Görtemaker, Heike B.: Ein deutsches Leben. Die Geschichte der Margret Boveri, Munich, C.H. Beck 2005, 
 Dambitsch, David: Eine Dame von Welt – Die politische Journalistin Margret Boveri (1900–1975), Munich, 
 Gillessen, Günther: Auf verlorenem Posten. Die Frankfurter Zeitung im Dritten Reich. Berlin 1986
 Ernst Klee: "Margret Boveri" Eintrag in ders.: Das Kulturlexikon zum Dritten Reich. Wer war was vor und nach 1945. S. Fischer, Frankfurt am Main 2007,

Further reading
 Görtemaker, Heike B (2004), doctoral thesis  Margret Boveri : Journalismus und Politik im Transformationsprozeß von der NS-Diktatur zur Bundesrepublik. (Margret Boveri: Journalism and Politics in the Transformation Process from the Nazi Dictatorship to the Federal Republic). MIK-Center, Berlin.

External links
 

1900 births
1975 deaths
German people of American descent
German people of Irish descent
Writers from Würzburg
Officers Crosses of the Order of Merit of the Federal Republic of Germany
20th-century German women writers
20th-century German writers
20th-century German journalists